Frank Flores (born 7 March 1969) is a Guamanian swimmer. He competed in two events at the 1992 Summer Olympics.

References

External links
 

1969 births
Living people
Guamanian male freestyle swimmers
Olympic swimmers of Guam
Swimmers at the 1992 Summer Olympics
Place of birth missing (living people)